Morelmaison is a commune in the Vosges department in Grand Est in northeastern France.

Inhabitants are called Mormageons.

Geography
The little River Vraine, a tributary of the Vair and thereby, indirectly, of the Meuse passes through the village.

See also
Communes of the Vosges department

References

Communes of Vosges (department)